FC Kariana Erden is a Bulgarian football club based in Erden, that plays in A Regional League, the 4th level of Bulgarian football.

History

2014–2020: Milan Yosifov Era
They become champions in 2015, winning the Bulgarian A Regional Group and promoting to V Group.  For the 2015-16 season, the team got a new sport complex.  They finished 5th in their first season in V Group, later known as Third League from 2016.

On 2 May 2017, after the lose against Litex Lovech, manager Georgi Vladimirov and one of the top players Petar Dimitrov were released from the team.  A day later, Atanas Dzhambazki was announced as the new manager of the team.  On 8 May 2018, the team won their promotion to the Second League.

In their debut season in the second league, Kariana finished 12th, thus ensuring another season in the second tier of Bulgarian football.

During the mid-season break of the 2020-21 season, the owners of Kariana announced that the club would be folding and will not take part after the season resumes in February. This controversial decision was made despite Kariana being at the top of the group at the time. On 11 January 2021 the owner of the club, Milan Yosifov, died after short illness, which was also one of the reasons for the team dissolving.

2021–present: Kameliya Yosifova took over and refoundation
On 27 April 2021, just few months after the clubs dissolving, Milan's daughter, Kameliya Yosifova, announced that she will took ober the club and refound it, joining the Bulgarian A Regional Group from 2021-22 season.

League positions

Honours
Second League:
 8th place: 2019–20
Third League:
  Winners (1): 2017–18
  Runners-up (1): 2016–17

A RFG Montana:
  Winners (1): 2014–15

Shirt and sponsor
Kariana's main colors are black and red and since 2014 their kit supplier are Zeus.

Players

Managers

Past seasons

References

External links
bgclubs.eu

Football clubs in Bulgaria
Association football clubs established in 2012
2012 establishments in Bulgaria
bg:ФК Кариана (Ерден)